This article presents a list of the historical events and publications of Australian literature during 1915.

Books 
 Arthur H. Adams – Grocer Greatheart: A Tropical Romance
 Mary Grant Bruce — From Billabong to London
 James Francis Dwyer 
 Breath of the Jungle
 The Green Half-Moon
 Sumner Locke – Skeeter Farm Takes a Spell
 Rosa Praed – Lady Bridget in the Never-Never Land: A Story of Australian Life
 Katharine Susannah Prichard – The Pioneers
 Ethel Turner – The Cub: Six Months in His Life: A Story in War-Time
 Lilian Turner – War's Heart Throbs

Short stories 
 Vance Palmer – The World of Men

Poetry 

 Zora Cross – "A Song of Mother Love"
 C. J. Dennis
 "Ginger Mick"
 The Songs of a Sentimental Bloke
 "The Stones of Gosh"
 Mabel Forrest
 The Green Harper
 "Wounded Soldiers"
 Henry Lawson 
 My Army, O, My Army! and Other Songs
 "Song of the Dardanelles"
 Louis Lavater – Blue Days and Grey Days: A Book of Sonnets
 Hugh McCrae – "Colombine"
 Nina Murdoch – Songs of the Open Air
 John Shaw Neilson – "The Loving Tree"
 Will H. Ogilvie – "The Australian"
 Nettie Palmer – Shadowy Paths
 Vance Palmer – The Forerunners
 A. B. Paterson – "The Mountain Squatter"
 Bertram Stevens – A Book of Australian Verse for Boys and Girls ed.

Births 

A list, ordered by date of birth (and, if the date is either unspecified or repeated, ordered alphabetically by surname) of births in 1915 of Australian literary figures, authors of written works or literature-related individuals follows, including year of death.

 3 March – Manning Clark, historian (died 1991)
 21 April – John Manifold, poet (died 1985)
 5 May – T. A. G. Hungerford, poet and novelist (died 2011)
 30 May – Michael Thwaites, poet and intelligence officer (died 2005)
 31 May – Judith Wright, poet (died 2000)
 6 July – Elizabeth Durack, artist and writer (died 2000)
 16 July – David Campbell, poet (died 1979)
 22 October – Mona Brand, playwright and poet (died 2007)
 22 December – David Martin, poet (died 1997)
 23 December – Wynne Whiteford, sf writer (died 2002)

Deaths 

A list, ordered by date of death (and, if the date is either unspecified or repeated, ordered alphabetically by surname) of deaths in 1915 of Australian literary figures, authors of written works or literature-related individuals follows, including year of birth.

 11 March – Rolf Boldrewood, novelist (born 1826)
 11 October – Menie Parkes, poet and short story writer (born 1839)

See also 
 1915 in poetry
 List of years in literature
 List of years in Australian literature
 1915 in literature
 1914 in Australian literature
 1915 in Australia
 1916 in Australian literature

References

Literature
Australian literature by year
20th-century Australian literature